A Life Grenadier Regiment may refer to:

 Life Regiment Grenadiers (I 3), Swedish military unit
 Life Grenadier Regiment (Sweden) (I 4), Swedish military unit
 1st Life Grenadier Regiment (Sweden) (I 4), Swedish military unit
 2nd Life Grenadier Regiment (Sweden) (I 5), Swedish military unit
 Life Grenadier Regiment of the Royal Prussian Guard, once commanded by Hans Sigismund von Lestwitz
 Royal Saxon 1st (Life) Grenadier Guard Regiment (No. 100), of the Royal Saxon Army
 Life-Guards Grenadier Regiment of the Russian Imperial Guard